Bank of Tryon Building, also known as the Tryon Daily Bulletin Building and Hester Building, is a historic bank building located at Tryon, Polk County, North Carolina.  It was built in 1907–1908, and is a two-story, two bay, Romanesque Revival style brick and stone building. It features granite quoins, second-story Palladian-type windows, and a projecting parapet. Since 1935, the building has been home to the Tryon Daily Bulletin, the world's smallest daily newspaper.

It was added to the National Register of Historic Places in 2008.

References

Bank buildings on the National Register of Historic Places in North Carolina
Romanesque Revival architecture in North Carolina
Commercial buildings completed in 1908
Buildings and structures in Polk County, North Carolina
National Register of Historic Places in Polk County, North Carolina
1908 establishments in North Carolina